Paulo Porto (1 September 1917 – 3 July 1999) was a Brazilian actor, film producer, director and screenwriter. He appeared in 32 films and television shows between 1947 and 1988. He starred in the 1973 film All Nudity Shall Be Punished, which won the Silver Bear at the 23rd Berlin International Film Festival. His 1971 film In the Family was entered into the 7th Moscow International Film Festival where it won a Silver Prize.

Filmography

References

External links

1917 births
1999 deaths
Brazilian male film actors
Brazilian film producers
Brazilian film directors
Brazilian screenwriters
Male actors from Rio de Janeiro (city)
20th-century Brazilian male actors
20th-century screenwriters